Libanopacha is a monotypic moth genus in the family Lasiocampidae erected by Zerny in 1933. Its single species, Libanopacha schwingenschussi, was described by the same author in the same year.

References

Lasiocampidae
Monotypic moth genera